Gist or GIST may refer to:

Business

Computing
 GiST (Generalized Search Tree), a flexible data structure for building search trees
 gist, an upper ontology in information science
 Gist, a pastebin service operated by GitHub
 Gist (graphics software), a scientific graphics library written in the C programming language
 Gist (contact manager), an online contact management service acquired by BlackBerry
 Ginān Index & Search Tool, a tool to make Ginans available to researchers and scholars

Medicine
 Gastrointestinal stromal tumor, a neoplasm of the gastrointestinal tract
 Gist processing, a cognitive process in fuzzy-trace theory

Organizations
 German Institute of Science and Technology (Singapore), a research and education institute
 Gist Communications, a former Internet-based TV listings and entertainment news provider
 Global Institute of Science & Technology, Haldia, West Bengal, India
 Gwangju Institute of Science and Technology, a research university in Gwangju City, South Korea
 Global Innovation through Science and Technology initiative, an entrepreneur coaching organization

Places
 Gist, Texas, a community in the US
 Mount Gist, Queen Maud Land, Antarctica

Other uses
 Gist (surname)
 The Gist (podcast), an American podcast by Slate magazine

See also
 Jist (disambiguation)